De Danadan is a 1987 Indian Marathi-language action comedy film directed and produced by Mahesh Kothare. The film stars Mahesh Kothare, Laxmikant Berde, Nivedita Joshi, Prema Kiran, Jairam Kulkarni, Deepak Shirke and Ambar Kothare.

Plot 
Sub-Inspector Mahesh Danke (Mahesh Kothare) and Constable Lakshman Tangmode alias Lakshya (Laxmikant Berde) are cousin brothers who leave their village and move to the village of Shrirangpur, Maharashtra for working as police officers. Their senior DSP Dhoipode (Jairam Kulkarni) is friends with a rich man named Raobahadur Vatlaave (Ambar Kothare), who is famous for his kindness and helpfulness. Mahesh falls in love with Dhoipode's daughter Gauri (Nivedita Joshi) while Lakshya finds himself falling for his neighbour Aavdakka (Prema Kiran). 

The government of Shrirangpur is carrying out an atomic research testing in a deserted area. However, Mahesh accidentally sends Lakshya to the same place for an important task on the day of the experiment. After being reminded by Dhoipode, Mahesh tries to contact Lakshya who ignorantly throws his walkie-talkie away as it stops working. While returning from the place, the explosion takes place but Lakshya miraculously survives and receives extraordinary superpowers due to this incident. 

Along with Mahesh, he decides to find out the criminal root in Shrirangpur by using this boon granted by Lord Hanuman. However, all the superpowers of Lakshya fail when he sees the red colour. Also, Vatlaave agrees to help them in taking down all the criminals. Together, Lakshya and Mahesh unfold the mystery of the Shrirangpur crime monitored by a dacoit named Dagdya Ramoshi (Deepak Shirke), and one of the police officers Inspector Kale (Prakash Phadtare) is involved with the criminals as well. 

Eventually, Lakshya and Mahesh discover that the crimelord whom the middlemen Dagdya and Kale are reporting to is Vatlaave himself who is serving as the highest source of crime in Shrirangpur. The duo search for evidences at Vatlaave's warehouse but their plan backfires as Vatlaave and Kale accuse them of being corrupt before Dhoipode. This provokes Dhoipode into arresting Lakshya and Mahesh and sending them to prison. Both Lakshya and Mahesh's mothers and their village headman arrive in Shrirangpur after learning about the duo's arrest. 

Along with Aavdakka and her father, they approach Vatlaave to request him to have Lakshya and Mahesh released from prison. While there, Aavdakka  reveals the truth of Lakshya's superpowers and their weakness to Vatlaave, unbeknownst of his true identity. Vatlaave slyly has Dagdya abduct Lakshya and Mahesh's mothers, their village headman, Aavdakka and her father and hold them all captive at their hideout. In prison, Lakshya and Mahesh are approached by Vatlaave's henchman who reveals them about the capture of their loved ones. 

Upon learning this, Lakshya and Mahesh are forced to escape from prison and Lakshya uses his super-speed to catch up to Vatlaave's car, but is interrupted by the red colour. Rescued and joined by Mahesh, Lakshya arrives on time at the hideout to save their loved ones and  overpowers all the criminals before calling in Dhoipode and the police to the scene. As a result, Vatlaave, Dagdya, Kale and the gang members are arrested and sent to prison for their crimes, while Lakshya and Mahesh's marriages are fixed with Aavdakka and Gauri, respectively.

Cast 
 Mahesh Kothare as Sub-Inspector Mahesh Danke
 Laxmikant Berde as Constable Lakshman Tangmode a.k.a. Lakshya
 Nivedita Joshi as Gauri Dhoipode
 Prema Kiran as Aavdakka
 Jairam Kulkarni as DSP K.R. Dhoipode
 Deepak Shirke as Dagdya Ramoshi
 Ambar Kothare as Raobahadur Bapusaheb Vatlaave
 Prakash Phadtare as Inspector G.R. Kale
 Shanta Inamdar as Parubai Tangmode (Lakshya's mother) 
 Saroj Sukhtankar as Gopikabai Danke (Mahesh's mother) 
 Bapusaheb Gavde as Tonage Ustaad (headman of Lakshya and Mahesh's village)   
 Bipin Varti as Gundappa Daku (dacoit in Lakshya's nightmare) 
 Vijay Kadam as Newsreader on TV 
 Ashok Pahelwan as Dagdya's henchman

External links
 

1980s Marathi-language films
1987 films
Films directed by Mahesh Kothare